Earl Edwin Morrall (May 17, 1934 – April 25, 2014) was an American professional football player who was a quarterback (and occasional punter) in the National Football League (NFL) for 21 seasons, both a starter and reserve. In the latter capacity, he became known as one of the greatest backup quarterbacks in NFL history, having served in the capacity for two Hall of Fame quarterbacks in Johnny Unitas and Bob Griese. He is most known for helping the Baltimore Colts win Super Bowl V and the Miami Dolphins complete their perfect season, having come off the bench when Griese became injured early in the year.

Pre-professional career
Morrall led Muskegon High School in Muskegon, Michigan to a state football championship in 1951 and state baseball championship in 1952 (where he stole home). He attended Michigan State University, where he played under head coaches Biggie Munn and Duffy Daugherty. He played three seasons for the Michigan State Spartans football team, leading them to a 9–1 record in the 1955 season. He capped his senior year with a victory over the UCLA Bruins in the 1956 Rose Bowl. Morrall also played baseball at Michigan State and played in the College World Series as a shortstop and third baseman. He was offered the opportunity to play professional baseball but chose instead to play football.

National Football League career
In his more than two decades on the professional gridiron, Morrall played for six different teams, starting with his rookie year in 1956 as a first-round selection by the San Francisco 49ers. He made appearances in the first four games before being slated to start the fifth game of the year on October 28. He went 7-of-12 for 148 yards with a touchdown and an interception. He started the next three games before appearing sporadically in two further games. In total, he went 38-of-78 with 621 passing yards with a touchdown and six interceptions. On the punting side, he kicked 45 of them for 1,705 yards (he would make occasional appearances as punter in seven seasons to total 106 for 3,995 yards with one block). On September 16, 1957, he was traded along with guard Mike Sandusky to the Pittsburgh Steelers in exchange for linebacker Marv Matuszak and two first-round draft picks. He would appear all twelve games that year for the Steelers (with eleven starts), helping them to a 6–6 record while throwing for 1,900 yards with eleven touchdowns to twelve interceptions. Despite the high cost of the transaction, the Steelers traded him just over a year later to the Detroit Lions in order to obtain future Hall of Famer Bobby Layne. He started the first two games of the 1958 season (both losses) before being traded to the Detroit Lions, for which he would appear sporadically in six games. Morrall was with the Lions for the next six years, having his best season in 1963 by throwing for 24 touchdowns and more than 2,600 yards. The following year, he suffered a season-ending shoulder injury in an October 18 contest against the Chicago Bears.

After spending the off-season rehabilitating from his injury, Morrall was dealt by the Lions to the New York Giants for Mike Lucci who had been acquired from the Cleveland Browns, Darrell Dess and a draft pick as part of a three-team transaction on August 30, 1965. The Browns obtained defensive back Erich Barnes from the Giants to complete the trade. Enduring his role during the Giants' rebuilding phase, Morrall threw for 2,446 yards and 22 touchdowns that season, but after breaking his wrist in 1966 found himself seeing spot duty over the course of the next two years after the Giants acquired Fran Tarkenton. He was traded to the Baltimore Colts for an undisclosed draft choice on August 25, 1968. Butch Wilson was sent to the Giants to complete the transaction eight days later on September 2. 

During the 1968 Baltimore Colts season, he filled in for the entire season for an injured Johnny Unitas, which resulted in the Colts winning all but one game in the regular season; He threw for 2,909 yards while leading the league with 26 touchdowns to 17 interceptions. They won the NFL Championship in a shutout victory but were upset in Super Bowl III against the New York Jets, where Morrall was taken out late for Unitas. Morrall had a chance to redeem his past woes with Super Bowl V. With the Colts trailing 13–6 in the second quarter, he was tasked to step in for Unitas, who was knocked out of the game on a rib injury. He would go 7-of-15 while throwing an interception with 147 yards. However, a series of turnovers and luck (Craig Morton, his counterpart, went 12-of-26 with 127 yards, one touchdown, and three interceptions, with the last two resulting in eventual Colt points) resulted in the Colts managing to keep themselves in the game, and Jim O'Brien would kick a field goal from 32 yards out to give the Colts a 16–13 victory. His next chance at regular season starts was in 1971, as he started the first nine games of the 1971 season for the Colts (while appearing in one further game). He threw for 1,210 yards with seven touchdowns and twelve interceptions as the Colts went on to a 10–4 record with Unitas handling the duties for the playoffs.

For the following year, he moved on to the Miami Dolphins (coached by Don Shula, who had managed Baltimore until 1970). After starting quarterback Bob Griese was hurt during the October 15 win against the San Diego Chargers, Morrall was tasked to start for the team, and he went 8-of-10 for 86 yards with two touchdowns while Miami won the game. With Miami at a 5–0 record, he proceeded to start the nine remaining games of the season, for which he would win all of them while throwing eleven touchdowns to seven interceptions on 1,360 yards as the team was buoyed mostly by its rushing attack (two of his starts had no touchdowns while two others didn't have an interception). The 1972 team achieved the first undefeated regular season in the NFL since 1942. He started the Divisional Round game against the Cleveland Browns and went 6-of-13 for 88 yards while the Dolphins managed to win 20-14 (on the strength of a blocked punt returned by Charlie Babb, two field goals, and a Jim Kiick touchdown). He started the AFC Championship Game against the Pittsburgh Steelers. He went 7-of-11 for 51 yards while throwing a touchdown and an interception. He was pulled later in the game for Griese while the Dolphins held on to win 21–17; Griese would start Super Bowl VII, which resulted in a victory and a Super Bowl ring for the Dolphins.  Overall, he filled in for eleven games for an injured Bob Griese, winning all of them. Together, Morrall and Griese won three postseason games (including Super Bowl VII) to complete the only perfect season in NFL history.

Over the next four seasons, he would make occasional appearances in games, starting three combined times while the Dolphins won another Super Bowl with Griese at the helm. He announced his retirement on May 2, 1977. Until first Doug Flutie and then Vinny Testaverde almost 30 years later, Morrall was the oldest quarterback to start and win a football game in the NFL. In those 21 seasons, he was part of 255 games, completing 1,379 passes for 20,809 yards and 161 touchdowns while having a 63-36-3 record as starter. In 2015, Morrall, Griese and Dan Marino were voted to the 50 greatest players in the Miami Dolphins’ 50-year history.

Morrall made Pro Bowl appearances following the 1957 and 1968 seasons and was named NFL MVP in 1968 and the AFC MVP for 1972. He led the league in passing in 1968 and the AFC in 1972.

In 2018, the Professional Football Researchers Association named Morrall to the PFRA Hall of Very Good Class of 2018.

Post-professional career

Morrall became the quarterback coach at the University of Miami in 1979. During his time there, he worked with Jim Kelly, Bernie Kosar, Vinny Testaverde and Mark Richt. In 1989, he was elected to the Davie, Florida city council and eventually became mayor. Morrall ran for the Florida House of Representatives District 97 seat as a Republican in 1992 and lost.

During a 1989 interview, Morrall was asked what it took to come off the bench and be an effective quarterback and team leader.  His response was, "When you get the chance to do the job, you have to do the job. That's all there is to it."

He died on April 25, 2014, at his son's home in Fort Lauderdale, Florida. He was 79. After death, examination of his brain disclosed that he had grade 4 (the most serious stage) chronic traumatic encephalopathy.

References

External links
 Muskegon Area Sports Hall of Fame profile
 
 

1934 births
2014 deaths
All-American college football players
American football quarterbacks
American football players with chronic traumatic encephalopathy
Baltimore Colts players
Detroit Lions players
Eastern Conference Pro Bowl players
Florida Republicans
Mayors of places in Florida
Miami Dolphins players
Michigan State Spartans football players
New York Giants players
People from Davie, Florida
Pittsburgh Steelers players
Players of American football from Michigan
San Francisco 49ers players
Sportspeople from Muskegon, Michigan
Sportspeople from Naples, Florida
Western Conference Pro Bowl players
Michigan State Spartans baseball players
National Football League Most Valuable Player Award winners